Bolemoreus is a genus of honeyeaters endemic to Australia. It contains former members of Lichenostomus, and was created after a molecular phylogenetic analysis published in 2011 showed that the original genus was polyphyletic.

The genus contains two species:

The name Bolemoreus was first proposed by Árpád Nyári and Leo Joseph in 2011. The word combines the names of the Australian ornithologists Walter E. Boles and N. Wayne Longmore.

References

 
Bird genera